The Affair of the Necklace is a 2001 film starring Hilary Swank.

The Affair of the Necklace may also refer to:

 Affair of the Diamond Necklace, a scandal in France in the 1780s
 The Necklace Affair, a 1967 Blake and Mortimer comic book
 , a 1946 French film directed by Marcel L'Herbier
 Controversy over the loss of a necklace by the favorite wife of the Islamic prophet, Muhammad by Aisha (circa 623–632 CE).

See also 

 The Queen's Necklace (disambiguation)